Kabisuryanagar is a Vidhan Sabha constituency of Ganjam district.
Area of this constituency includes Kabisuryanagar, Kodala, part of Kabisuryanagar block and part of Purusottampur block.

Elected Members

12 elections held during 1967 to 2014. List of members elected from this constituency are:

2019: Latika Pradhan (BJD)
2014: V. Sugnana Kumari Deo (BJD)
2009: V. Sugnana Kumari Deo (BJD)
2004: Ladu Kishore Swain (BJD)
 2000: Nityananda Pradhan (CPI)
 1995: Harihar Swain (Congress) 
 1990: Nityananda Pradhan (CPI)
 1985: Radhagobinda Sahu (Congress)
 1980: Radhagobinda Sahu (Congress-I)
 1977: Tarini Pattnayak (Janata)
 1974: Sadananda Mohanty (CPI)
 1971: Sadananda Mohanty (Communist)
 1967: Dandpani Swain (Communist)

2019 Election Result

2014 Election Result
In 2014 election, Biju Janata Dal candidate V. Sugnana Kumari Deo defeated  Independent candidate Hara Prasad Sahu by a margin of 21,500 votes.

2009 Election Result
In last 2009 election Biju Janata Dal candidate V. Sugnana Kumari Deo, defeated Indian National Congress candidate Kishore Palei by 23,068 votes.

Notes

References

Assembly constituencies of Odisha
Politics of Ganjam district